Records in Contexts, or RiC, is a conceptual model and ontology for the archival description of records, designed by the Expert Group on Archival Description (EGAD) established by the International Council on Archives (ICA). The EGAD initially began work on the standard between 2012 and 2016, with a conceptual model (RiC-CM) and an ontology (RiC-O) released for comment during 2016.

Content

The Conceptual Model aims to bring together the Council's current descriptive standards, namely the General International Standard Archival Description (ISAD(G)), International Standard Archival Authority Records — Corporate Bodies, Persons, and Families (ISAAR(CPF)), International Standard Description of Functions (ISDF), and International Standard Description of Institutions with Archival Holdings (ISDIAH). RiC also aims to be better suited to the management of electronic records than previous standards, whilst still supporting traditional analogue materials. It defines the primary descriptive entities of the model, and how these interrelate within archival description. RiC also aims to modernise the aging current standards, by enabling archival description to better capture the complex relationships records have with each other, and with their creators, holders, and subjects. These groups, individuals, and organisations are referred to as "agents" in RiC. Through these relationships, RiC aims to provide a richer descriptive context than the hierarchical structure of ISAD(G).

Response

The conceptual model was published for comment in 2016. Among the responses, some have shown confusion as to how it should be applied in practice. A consultation meeting of the Archives and Records Association's Archives and Technology group expressed uncertainty over how the conceptual model should be interpreted by the profession, and how they would engage with and benefit from it in the future.

In their response, the InterPARES Trust state that a more inclusive development process should have been used given the potentially international application of the model, referring especially to the under-representation of Africa and Asia (acknowledged by EGAD in their introduction to the RiC-CM). Their response also questions the integration of the entire suite of current ICA descriptive standards without first gauging the extent to which these are currently implemented globally.

OWL Ontology

The EGAD has published an OWL ontology called RiC-O to represent RiC-CM in version 0.1 in December 2019. An ontology proposal based on the draft of the conceptual model was made available already in 2017.

References 

Archival science
International standards
Library cataloging and classification